The Kaiserpanorama (or Kaiser-Panorama) is a form of stereoscopic entertainment medium used chiefly in the 19th and early 20th centuries, a precursor to film, invented by August Fuhrmann (1844–1925). It was patented by the inventor ca. 1890. There would be a number of viewing stations through which people would peer through a pair of lenses showing a number of rotating stereoscopic glass slides. By 1910 he is said to have controlled exhibitions in over 250 branches across Europe, and in the central archive have up to 100,000 slides stored.

Description

A kaiserpanorama would normally have around 25 wooden stations, each with a pair of viewing lenses. Inside the device there would be a rotating mechanism showing numerous stereoscopic images on rear-illuminated glass, giving a 3D effect.

Reconstructions
Various modern reconstructions, as well as a few authentic remaining kaiserpanoramas, exist in the Munich Stadtmuseum, Wels, German Historical Museum, the Märkisches Museum (Berlin), Neugersdorf, Pioneer Settlement (Swan Hill, Australia), Muzeum Kinematografii (Łódź, Poland), Deutsches Technikmuseum (Berlin), the Dusseldorf Film Museum, the Teylers Museum (Haarlem, Holland) and the Fotomuseum Antwerp. Another example is the Warsaw Fotoplastikon, built in 1905, which, despite very similar design, is not under the name kaiserpanorama. During the German occupation, it was used by the Polish resistance as a meeting point.
There was a dismantled kaiserpanorama in Snibston Discovery Museum in Coalville, Leicestershire, UK. However, since the museum is now closed, the item is now in storage and under the care of Leicester City Council.

The museum of the occupation at the Oskar Schindler's Enamel Factory in Kraków, Poland, uses a fotoplastikon to show historical pictures.

References

External links

 http://www.aiq.talktalk.net/3D/kaiserpanorama.htm
 http://inthejungleofcities.wordpress.com/2011/02/06/the-kaiser-panorama/
 http://ignomini.com/photographica/stereophotovintage/kaiserpanorama/kaiserpanorama.html
 http://dmim-blog.com/2012/12/28/the-kaiser-panorama/

Audiovisual introductions in 1890

History of film
Optical toys
Optical illusions
3D imaging
Film and video technology